Lise Annique Leveille (born April 14, 1982, in Burnaby, British Columbia) is a French Canadian gymnast who represented Canada at the 2000 Olympic Games.

After graduating from Handsworth Secondary School in North Vancouver, she became part of gymnastics team of Stanford University, where she received her BSc degree in Biomechanical engineering and Human biology. She subsequently obtained her MD degree from Queen's University at Kingston. She furthermore has an MHSc degree and an PhD degree in Neuroscience from the University of British Columbia (UBC). In 2014, she completed her residency in orthopaedic surgery at UBC and became a Fellow of The Royal College of Surgeons of Canada (FRCSC).  In August 2014 started a fellowship in pediatric orthopaedic surgery at Texas Scottish Rite Hospital for Children in Dallas, Texas. Since 2015, she is a staff pediatric orthopaedic surgeon at British Columbia Children's Hospital, specializing in knee and athletic injuries. Since 2020, Leveille is appointment as Undergraduate Medical Education Director for Orthopaedics of the University of British Columbia.

Lise Leveille obtained her medical degree at UBC and is currently training as an orthopaedic surgical resident in Vancouver, BC.

References

External links
 
 sports-reference

1982 births
Canadian female artistic gymnasts
Franco-Columbian people
Gymnasts at the 1999 Pan American Games
Gymnasts at the 2000 Summer Olympics
Living people
Sportspeople from Burnaby
Stanford Cardinal women's gymnasts
Pan American Games gold medalists for Canada
Commonwealth Games medallists in gymnastics
Commonwealth Games bronze medallists for Canada
Pan American Games medalists in gymnastics
Gymnasts at the 1998 Commonwealth Games
Olympic gymnasts of Canada
Medalists at the 1999 Pan American Games
Medallists at the 1998 Commonwealth Games